Pos Chiquito or Pos Chikito is a town in Savaneta on the island of Aruba. It is located on the main road between Oranjestad and San Nicolaas. It has become known for its coral reef, and has a small diving cove. Pos Chiquito is noted for its snorkelling, especially during September and October during the coral spawning season, and sea turtles and manta rays can be seen.

References

Populated places in Aruba
Beaches of Aruba